gauge railways are narrow gauge railways with track gauge of . This type of rail was promoted especially in the colonies of the British Empire during the second half of the nineteenth century by Thomas Hall and Everard Calthrop.

Railways

See also

Heritage railway
Large amusement railways
List of track gauges

References

External links

World-wide 30" Gauge Railways and Railroads